Keala Keanaaina (born May 30, 1977) is a former American football fullback who played two seasons with the San Jose SaberCats of the Arena Football League. He first enrolled at San Jose State University before transferring to the College of San Mateo and lastly the University of California, Berkeley. He attended Junípero Serra High School in San Mateo, California. Keanaaina was also a member of the Cleveland Browns of the National Football League.

Early years
Keanaaina played high school football for the Junípero Serra High School Padres. As a junior, Keanaaina led the Serra Padre varsity football team in tackles, with a record 143 tackles, earning All WCAL first team, All Peninsula second team and All San Mateo County second team honors as a linebacker. In his senior campaign, Keanaaina earned WCAL Defensive Player of the Year, first team All WCAL, first team All Peninsula, and first team All San Mateo County honors as a 6-1, 200-pound linebacker.

College career

San Jose State University
Keanaaina first played college football for the San Jose State Spartans. Keanaaina was one of two true freshmen to play and start on the San Jose Spartans team.  He played in ten of eleven games at linebacker and on special teams his freshman year in 1994. Keanaaina was selected to the Western Athletic Conference (WAC) All Freshmen team as a linebacker.  He then spent a year and a half preparing for his Mormon mission.

College of San Mateo
Keanaaina later transitioned from linebacker to playing the fullback position for the first time for the San Mateo Bulldogs, recording over 1,000 rushing yards and fourteen rushing touchdowns on the season. Following his lone season at CSM, Keanaaina was awarded the team's Most Valuable Player (MVP), Offensive Player of the Year, and Most Inspirational. Keanaaina earned first team All NCFC honors as a fullback and also completed his associate degree (A.A.) in Liberal Arts.  Keanaaina received several football scholarship offers and accepted a full athletic football scholarship to the University of California at Berkeley. He had previously served a two-year Mormon mission to Boston Massachusetts from 1996-97.

University of California, Berkeley
Keanaaina played for the California Golden Bears from 1999 to 2000.  Due to his versatility and athletic ability, Keanaaina was a standout player on offense and as an H-Back, led in all statistical categories for his position.  Keanaaina was one of five California Golden Bear football players expected to enter or be drafted in the 2001 National Football League Draft.

Keanaaina was also a member of the California Golden Bears Rugby team and played the position of Wi

Professional career

San Jose SaberCats
Keanaaina was signed to the San Jose SaberCats' practice squad on June 13, 2001. He was placed on injured reserve on April 15, 2002. He rushed for 250 yards and ten touchdowns in 2003, earning First Team All-Arena honors. Keanaaina was awarded the Sabercats Rookie of the Year award and established several team rushing records during his first active season. Following an injury plagued season, Keanaaina rushed for 65 yards and five touchdowns in 2004.  Keanaaina was a key member in the Sabercats two championship victories, ArenaBowl XVI and ArenaBowl XVIII.

Cleveland Browns
Keanaaina signed with the Cleveland Browns on July 22, 2003. He was released by the Browns on August 4, 2003.

References

External links
Just Sports Stats
College stats

Living people
1977 births
Players of American football from Hawaii
American football fullbacks
American football linebackers
San Jose State Spartans football players
San Mateo Bulldogs football players
California Golden Bears football players
San Jose SaberCats players
People from Hawaii (island)
Native Hawaiian people
Junípero Serra High School (San Mateo, California) alumni